is a 1967 French-language novel written by Melvin Van Peebles that was turned into the film The Story of a Three-Day Pass (1967).

History
By the late 1950s, Van Peebles had been involved in filmmaking and had made two short films. He was unable to establish himself as a film director in Hollywood because the concept of a black director was unheard of in America at that time.  Consequently, he went to France, learned the language, and wrote  in French.

Learning he could adapt one of his novels into film with a $60,000 grant from the French Cinema Center, so long as his film was "artistically valuable, but not necessarily commercially viable," he sought a film producer.

1967 American novels
French-language novels
Novels by Melvin Van Peebles
American novels adapted into films